The Sabugal Castle is a castle in the city of Sabugal, near the Côa river, in central Portugal. With a pentagonal outer wall and an inner wall with five square towers, this castle is an example of Gothic architecture in Portugal.

Castles in Portugal
Sabugal
National monuments in Guarda District
Buildings and structures in Sabugal